Kammavari palli, also known as Kammavaripalli, is a village located in the Nellore district in Andhra Pradesh, India. It is close to the banks of the Penna River.

References

Villages in Nellore district